Anne de la Blanchetai Donahue is an American politician from the state of Vermont. She has served as a Republican member of the Vermont House of Representatives since 2003, representing the Washington-1 district, which includes the Washington County towns of Berlin and Northfield.  Donohue represented Washington-2 until 2013, when she was redistricted. She is also editor of Counterpoint, a quarterly mental health publication distributed for free throughout Vermont.

Education and early career
Anne Donahue was born on March 20, 1956, in Burlington, Vermont. She attended the Cours de Civilisation Française de la Sorbonne in Paris in 1976. Donahue earned a bachelor's degree in political science and philosophy from Boston College in 1978, and received a Juris Doctor degree at Georgetown University Law Center in 1981.

Starting in 1981, Donahue worked as a program director for the New York City location of Covenant House, the largest privately funded childcare agency in the United States providing shelter and service to homeless and runaway youths. She served as senior staff attorney for the New York location until 1986 and stayed on as program director until 1988, when she left to become executive director of the Covenant Center location in Los Angeles. Whereas in New York the youths she helped consisted largely of urban poor street youths, the young people she served in California came originally from middle- and upper-middle-class homes from all around the country, but who had been living in the California streets for as many as three years and become exposed to psychological damage and AIDS. Donahue served as the California location's executive director until 1990. That year, she received the Jefferson Lifetime Achievement Award for Greatest Public Service by an Individual 35 Years or Younger.

In 1990, Donahue moved to Northfield, Vermont, where her family has roots going back five generations. From 1991 to 1996, Donahue worked as a junior high school teacher in Winooski, Vermont. In 1998, she became editor of Counterpoint, a quarterly mental health publication published by Vermont Psychiatric Survivors, Inc., which is distributed free throughout Vermont and has a circulation of about 7,000. , Donahue continues to serve as editor of the publication.

Donahue has served on a number of non-legislative committees, including the Act 129 Parity Committee (2000–2004); the State Standing Committee for Adult Mental Health (2000–2004); the Fletcher Allen Health Care Mental Health Task Force (2001–2004); the State Hospital Futures Committee (2004); and the Corrections Stakeholder Mental Health Committee (2004). She has also served on the U.S. Secretary of Health and Human Services Advisory Committee on Human Research Protections, and was a member of Rotary International from 2003 to 2004.

Vermont House
Anne Donahue, a Republican, has been serving as a representative on the Vermont House of Representatives since 2003. She represents the Washington-2 district, which includes the Washington County towns of Moretown, Northfield, and Roxbury. Donahue has been serving on the Mental Health Oversight Committee since 2003, as has been described in the Rutland Herald as "one of the Legislature's strongest mental health advocates". Donahue was also the ranking minority member of the Human Services Committee.

On April 2, 2009, Donahue was one of five Vermont House Republicans who voted in favor of a bill allowing same-sex marriages in the state; the bill passed with an overall vote of 95–52. Donahue was instrumental in amending the bill to clarify a distinction between civil and religious marriage. The Log Cabin Republicans, a gay and lesbian political organization, awarded their annual Uncommon Courage Award in April 2009 to Donahue and seven other Vermont Republican lawmakers for their votes in favor of gay marriage.

Personal life
Donahue is a single mother of an adopted adult son. She is Roman Catholic, and is a member, lector and extraordinary minister of Holy Communion at the St. John the Evangelist RC Church in Northfield. Her favorite movies are Life is Beautiful and Romero, and her favorite books are The Yearling by Marjorie Kinnan Rawlings, Little Men by Louisa May Alcott and To Kill a Mockingbird by Harper Lee.

References

1956 births
Catholics from Vermont
Living people
Republican Party members of the Vermont House of Representatives
Politicians from Burlington, Vermont
People from Northfield, Vermont
Women state legislators in Vermont
21st-century American politicians
21st-century American women politicians